John Komnenos Doukas Palaiologos Synadenos was a Byzantine noble and military leader in the early 14th century, holding the court title of megas konostaulos. 

He was the son (possibly the eldest) of the megas stratopedarches John Synadenos, and brother of the protostrator Theodore Synadenos. He inherited the surname "Palaiologos" from his mother, Theodora Palaiologina Synadene, and was commonly referred to by it. He married a lady named Thomais, descended form the imperial dynasties of Laskaris and Palaiologos, although her exact parentage is unknown. No children of his are known. Very little is known about his life, except that he acted as an emissary of Andronikos III Palaiologos to his grandfather Andronikos II during the closing stages of the Byzantine civil war of 1321–1328, along with John Aplesphares.

Sources
 

14th-century deaths
14th-century Byzantine people
Byzantine generals
John 2
Year of birth unknown
Megaloi konostauloi